Coenipeta medina is a species of moth in the family Erebidae first described by Achille Guenée in 1852. The species is found from Texas through Central America and Cuba to Brazil.

References

Moths described in 1852
Omopterini
Moths of North America
Moths of South America